The Sudan women's national volleyball team represents Sudan in international women's volleyball competitions and friendly matches.

They appeared at the 1976 African Women's Volleyball Championship in Egypt.

References
Sudan Volleyball Federation

National women's volleyball teams
Volleyball
Volleyball in Sudan
Women's sport in Sudan